Schonstett is a municipality  in the district of Rosenheim in Bavaria in Germany.

History
In the Middle Ages, Schonstett was the capital of the dominion of the Baron of Schleich. In the course of the 1818 administrative reform in Bavaria Schonstett became an independent municipality.

Culture and sights
 Saint John the Baptist (parish church)
 Castle and castle gardens

Sports
 SV Schonstett
 Schloßschützen (marksmen)

Education
 Grundschule Schonstett (elementary school)
 Kindergarten "Fridolin Pusteblume" (nursery)

Youth
 KLJB Schonstett (for Catholic rural youth)

References

External links
History of Schonstett (in German)

Rosenheim (district)